Calella is a municipality in the Maresme region of Spain, located 50 km from Barcelona, 50 km from Girona and 6 km from the Montnegre-Corredor Natural Park. It is known as the tourist capital of the Costa del Maresme and is characterized by being a cosmopolitan city with a typical Mediterranean climate. 

Its urban layout, with a central pedestrian and commercial area, green spaces and wide range accommodation offer, make of Calella an important tourist destination. 

Calella has beaches three kilometers in length and more than 180,000 m2 of golden sand, blue waters, and natural areas such as Dalmau Park, Manuel Puigvert promenade, Garbí promenade, The Lighthouse or The Turrets. 

Calella is a city with almost 700 years of history. It has been, and still is today open to the sea and the mountains, jealous of its history, of a past rich in facts and always open to Catalanness, which has become, over the years, a newcomers receiving community

For some years now, an ambitious process has been set in motion: to become a city of reference in sports, health, cultural and family tourism. The population's clear commitment to sport and culture is demonstrated in a wide range of sports, cultural, artistic, leisure and family activities promoted by the City Council, as well as in the wide variety of facilities and sport disciplines that can be practiced in the city.

Demography

The population as much as triples in the summer holiday season.

History 
Early History  

From the 1st century BC, the progressive process of Romanization gave rise to numerous villas in the lower areas of the coast, connected by the Roman road that lead to Barcino (Barcelona). These were agricultural mansions dedicated to the production of wheat, oil or wine. In Calella, the remains of a Roman villa that could be dated between the 1st century BC and the 1st century AD have been excavated close to the city hospital. 

It is not until the 11th century that we have data of the existence of a settlement in the Capaspre area integrated into the parish of Pineda de Mar and under the stately dependence of the Lord of Montpalau Castle. It consisted of a small number of farmhouses located at the top of the stream, with a defense tower and a couple of chapels dedicated to Saint Quirze and Saint Julita.

The name Calella has been documented since the beginning of the 12th century. From then on, away from the Saracen danger, some residents of the Capaspre area built their first fishermen's houses near the mouth of the stream. The will of Bishop Bernat Umbert, written in 1101, is the oldest document found that refers to Calella 

Other important dates related to the birth of the city are in 1327, when Viscount Bernat II of Cabrera, lord of Montpalau, granted the privilege of having a market and the settlement charter, and in 1338 when the market privileges were enlarged. 

By then it had a defense tower and a new chapel dedicated to Saint Elm.

During the sixteenth century the city was drawing up its urban framework and, in 1525 the Pope authorized the construction of a church. Three years later, the works of the temple began. While the Church was being built, the people of Calella received the sacraments in the chapel of Sant Elm. In 1564 the new church was consecrated and in 1599 Gastó de Moncada, Marquis of Aitona and Viscount of Cabrera, granted new privileges establishing the definitive organization of the municipal council, represented by juries and councillors, renewable annually, and dividing the inhabitants into three classes: wealthy, craftsmen and day labourers. In the 1570s, Abraham Ortelius first mapped Calella's name on a map of the peninsula. In 1586 Calella already had an urban plan made to scale.

After a long period of stagnation due to the wars and epidemics that ravaged the country during the seventeenth century, from 1714, once the War of Succession ended, the city began a process of demographic and economic growth, going from the 768 inhabitants in 1718 to 2,637 in 1787. During these years, the traditional agricultural and fishing activities were expanded with boat construction. The last third of the century, thanks to the liberalization of trade with the American colonies, was the golden age of overseas trade, which contributed decisively to the industrial development of the entire region. In 1790 there were already more than 200 looms dedicated to the manufacture of silk and cotton stockings.

By the end of the century, many new streets had been added to the initial nucleus, becoming Església Street and Jovara Street the new central streets. 

19th and 20th Centuries

Despite wars and revolutions, industrial activity (textiles) and transatlantic trade maintained their production.  In 1854 the construction of large boats and fishing boats began. On August 1, 1861, the train officially arrived in Calella, although it had been stopping at a Calella temporary stop since 1859. The population began a period of growth, from 3,500 inhabitants in 1860 to 4,316 in 1900. The cause of this growth was the installation of the first steam-powered factories, which offset the upheaval in maritime trade caused by the loss of the colonies. 

The first decades of the 20th century were a time of splendour for Calella's industry, which was cut short by the civil war. The decline of the textile sector went hand in hand with the spectacular development of tourism, especially from the sixties onwards. This process is clearly reflected in demographics: strong growth from 1900 to 1930, stagnation between 1930 and 1960, and spectacular growth during the 1960s and 1970s.

In the 1970s until the mid-1990s, Calella became a very important tourist destination for Central European tourism (German, Dutch, Danish, English, French), and was thus popularly known as Calella dels Alemanys as its population tripled in the high tourist season (which coincides with the end of spring, summer and the beginning of autumn). Currently the variety of tourism has grown, and visitors are received from virtually every country in Europe.

Places of historical and patrimonial interest 

Parish Church of Santa Maria and Sant Nicolau.  In 1525 Calella obtained from Pope Clement VII the bull that granted it the right to become an independent parish. The construction of the new temple was entrusted to the Barcelona master builder Pere Suarís in 1539. Later the work was entrusted to the builder Antoni Mateu, but his premature death forced the hiring of the famous sculptor and master builder Jean de Tours, who died in Calella in 1563 leaving the work unfinished. Finally, the masters Joan Soler, from Calella, and Perris Rohat, a Frenchman living in Mataró, were commissioned to complete the temple. The new church was consecrated in 1564.

The Baroque style façade, the work of Jean de Tours, consists of a stone altarpiece from the 16th century, in the Plateresque style, with the heads of the twelve apostles. In the niche is Saint Nicolau de Bari, under whose dedication, together with that of Santa Maria, the parish was consecrated.

Sant Quirze and Santa Julita Chapel At the end of the 14th century Calella had a chapel dedicated to Sant Elm, near the beach, which was enabled as a parish in 1528, while the new church of Santa Maria and Sant Nicolau was being built. In March 1820, the patrons of Calella, Sant Quirze and Santa Julita, were welcomed in Sant Elm Chapel due to the collapse of the hermitage located in La Riera Capaspre, changing its invocation.

Can Galceran (can Giol) Its construction began in 1430, it was completed at a later date, in the 15th and16th centuries after various acquisitions of land. It was the manor house of the Monet Ballester family (15th century) and later the Galceran family (17th century). The elements to be highlighted are the semicircular doorway, the Renaissance windows, the talking shield (a Galceran, a bush) and the machicolation over the main door.

Can Salvador de la Plaça Splendid building with a 4-sided roof, built in the 14th century. This house can be considered as one of the first houses that formed the current urban nucleus of Calella around the market. Its most outstanding elements are its Renaissance portal, the decoration of the windows and the defensive machicolation on the corner of Carrer Bartrina, the street that overlooked the sea. It is currently the headquarters of the Municipal Library.

Can Bartrina Manor house of the Coma de Capaspre family, with a shield over the door, and also of the Bataller family and later on of the Prim family, notaries from Barcelona. Its unique elements are the portal, the windows, its classic sgraffito and the defensive tower to protect the façade, with stone corners and crowned with a machicolation of which only the corbels that supported it remain. The complex, including the defense tower, was completed in the 16th century.

Can Basart It had formerly been the home of the Pla family, which linked up with the Basart family in the early 18th century. The house is Baroque style and part of the façade preserves the sgraffito with geometric motifs.

(Sources: Ruta Renaixentista / "Compilació Històrica de Calella", by Domingo Mir. Ed. Cedro, 1982)

The Lighthouse - It is one of the most characteristic symbols of the city. It is located at the top of the Capaspre, the same place where an old medieval tower had stood. It was inaugurated in 1859, with an olive oil light lantern. The lighthouse housed the lighthouse keeper's house on the ground floor, and both the lantern and the building have undergone several modifications over time. Since 2011 it has housed the Calella Lighthouse Interpretation Center, where the lighthouse's communication relationships with its surroundings are explained.

The Turrets - Two towers built on the top of Capaspre in the mid-nineteenth century, one for civil use and the other for military use, intended for the transmission of optical signals through the optical telegraphy system.

(Sources: POUM and "Les Torretes de Calella a study", by Pere F. Porti i Gallart. Ajuntament de Calella, 1984.)

Works of the architect Jeroni Martorell Terrats:

* Parc Dalmau. - Extensive green area located in the city center, designed in the late 20s of the 20th century from the purchase of land on the estate of Can Pelaio by the City Council, and then chaired by Jaume Dalmau. It is a unique place to walk and enjoy nature, with the botanical itinerary and places like La Font dels Lleons or the Pati del Ós. It annually hosts L’Aplec de la Sardana and various cultural and festive events. Inside the Park, an Air Raid Shelter was built in 1937 to protect the population from the bombings of the Civil War.

* Passeig de Manuel Puigvert.- This tree-lined promenade with centuries-old banana trees, stretches parallel to the beach and has become one of the city icons. Mayor Manuel Puigvert (1843-1913) embellished this environment, transforming it into a place for leisure and social relations, an idea space to enjoy the shade and the sea breeze on hot summer afternoons. Jeroni Martorell had a magnificent balustrade built, decorated with lanterns, goblets and steps. The promenade hosts, among other activities, the Calella and Alt Maresme Fair and The Ironman sporting event.

* Municipal Market - Noucentista style building built in 1927 in the old Plaça de l’Hostal (or del Rei). It consists of a single nave of 15x24 meters, and a porch on the main facade of Carrer Sant Joan. Next to it there is a water tower similar to that of the slaughterhouse. The market had a covered porch annex on the other side of the road, of the same style, now gone.

* Former Costa i Fornaguera Library The building, which follows the Noucentista style or the market and the slaughterhouse, was designed as a school group and was inaugurated in 1923. Later, in 1931, the public library was installed on the first floor. The ground floor is divided into two wings around a central courtyard, while the main entrance to the facade consists of a porch with classical columns supporting semi-circular arches. It is currently the municipal nursery "El Carrilet"

* Old Municipal Slaughterhouse Nouecentista construction, contemporary with the Market and the Library, inaugurated in 1927. Originally it had annexed constructions for the corrals, cold rooms or the watchman's house. A water tower was also built next to it.

(Source: POUM y "Jeroni Martorell, un arquitecte per a Calella". Ajuntament de Calella. 2004.)

(Source: "Anècdotes, Fets i Personatges de la Calella antiga". Calella, 1978)

Culture 

Oral tradition - The story of "La Llopa" (the she-wolf)

The figure of “la Llopa” (the she-wolf) of Calella comes from an event that occurred around 1920. A local resident explained to the people of the local tavern that he had seen a wolf going down the stream. After a few days, he informed the Mayor that he had seen two more wolves. Alarmed, farmers and volunteers went out to look for the animals, killing one of them and exposing it on the porch of the mayor's garden for the people to see.

But that couple of animals were actually nothing more than wolf dogs from a farm located between Sant Pol de Mar and Calella, which went to the slaughterhouse every day to eat the waste. Since then, the citizens of the surrounding towns, referring to the people of Calella, mockingly exclaim "Calella, la Llopa!".

(Source: "Anecdotes, Fets i Personatges de la Calella Antiga". Calella, 1978)

Festivals and Traditions 

·        L’Aplec de la Sardana: (Catalan traditional dance Sardana gathering) every first Sunday in June.  Since1926. 

·        Festa Major Petita (town Festival): 16 June, in honor of Sant Quirze and santa Julita.

·        Festa Major de la Minerva (Town Festival): 23 de September

·        Calella i l’Alt Maresme Fair:  23 September.  The Fair aims to be a Sample of Catalan products and traditions

·        Beer Festival (Oktoberfest): Emulates the German tradition, during the month of October a large tent hosts German and European bands and offers a culinary sample of products from that country.

·        Carnival Parade of The Alt Maresme

·        Setmana de la Salut (health week) : "Per la teva salut Vincula’ t"

·        Feria Animalista (Pro-Animal Fair)

·        European Choral Singing Festival 

·        Sing for Gold, the world choral cup 

·        Festimatge (film and photography festival)

·        Screamin 'Festival

·        Calella Film Festival

·        Summer Nights Festival in Calella

·        International Folklore Festival "Alegria"

·        Calella Folk Festival

·        Fira Renaixentista (Renaissance Fair)

·        Amateur Theatre Competition 

·        Calella Rockfest Festival

·        Internacional festival  "Canta al Mar"

·        Temporada lírica (lyrical season) 

·        Calella está de Moda (Calella is fashionable)

·        Jornades Internacionals Folclóricas de Catalunya (Folk Festival)

·        Fira de la Gent Gran (the Elderly Fair)

·        Jocs Florals (of Catalan Poetry Festival)

·        Fira del Llibre (Book-Fair)

·        Fira del disc (Record-Fair)

Museums 

Museum of Tourism. The Museum of Tourism of Calella was born as a unique museum proposal in the world that aims to show in an attractive, educational and participatory way, the history of tourism and its socio-cultural and economic effects at a global level. The visit to the Museum of Tourism (Mutur) proposes a walk through the history of tourism, counting from the routes of the first travellers and explorers to the present time of the sector. The equipment arises from the need to create and give value to tourism and heritage, consolidate a reference centre for research and disseminations of the tourism sector, promote the culture of tourism and create a centre for citizen activity, thought and conceived with a vocation for public service and as a reference pedagogical centre.

Museum – Municipal Archive of Calella Maria Codina Bagué. It is located in a large house of the XVl and XVll centuries, which over the years has been used for various purposes. Since 1979 it has been the headquarters of the Museum-Archive. This is a local multidisciplinary museum that researches, preserves and disseminates different aspects of the city's heritage. Collections of various themes are on display, highlighting, among others, those dedicated to the textile past, the overseas trade, the Gallart Art Gallery and the Barri Pharmacy.

Calella Lighthouse Interpretation Centre. The Calella Lighthouse Interpretation Center was opened to the public on June 13, 2011. 

Around the figure of the Calella Lighthouse, the Centre aims to explain the communication relations from three perspectives: the maritime communications, for this intrinsic functionality of orientation to boats, the terrestrial communications, through optical telegraphy that  we can contemplate in The Turrets, close to the Lighthouse,  and the urban communication with the city, by means of church bells and various bell towers. The contents are explained in an entertaining way through audio-visual materials and texts in three languages: Catalan, Spanish and English.

The Air-raid shelter of Dalmau Park started to work in 1937 in order to protect the civilian population from air-attacks. It had a capacity to shelter 3.600 people. It is part of the Memorial Spaces Network of Catalonia and in 2010 was restored and signposted in order to open it to the public. It is a cultural good of local interest by means of which it is possible to get to know one of the most important chapters in the history of Calella: the civil war. As of today, the shelter is a vestige which represents the fight for achieving the democratic rights and liberties in Catalonia.

Entities and Associations 
Calella has a large number or associations with intense associative activity.

http://www.calella.cat/la-ciutat/entitats

Audiovisuals 

Since 2010, Calella City Council has been part of the Catalonia Film Commission, a network of filming offices throughout Catalonia created to facilitate filming in its spaces. With this intention, the City Council has created Calella Film Office, a free public service that provides assistance to filming and audiovisual productions in the search for locations, management of permits, to make Calella a Plato City.

Main audiovisual events:

Calella Film Festival

Festimatge

Economy: Tourism and Trade 

The service sector and specifically the tourism sector is clearly the engine of the municipality's economy. Calella has been a tourist destination since the first tourists discovered the city, when the people of Calella lived on fishing and the countryside, first, and the textile industry, later. Over the years, tourism has become the engine of the city's economy. To the natural elements such as the sun and the beach, attractions have been added such as sports tourism, which is one in which the main reason for the trip is the practice of some kind of sport or physical activity and the visit of the city for witness ‘in situ’ a competition or a sporting event, family tourism and cultural tourism.

In recent years, Calella City Council has made a commitment to the organization of sporting and cultural events with an international dimension to position the municipality internationally as a destination for family and sports tourism. Since 2009 Calella has enjoyed the distinction of Sports Tourism Destination (DTE) for the promotion and marketing of its tourist offer related to the multi-sport offer, and in 2014 the Catalan Tourism Agency awarded Calella is the Family Tourism Destination certification, a certification that is granted to destinations that have a certified offer of accommodation, restaurants, and leisure and leisure establishments aimed at children.

Trade is a very important economic factor in Calella. Its most central streets make up a large shopping center with a very varied offer and a rich mixed commercial with more than 1000 shops and services. The attraction of this shopping center lies in the combination of modernity of most of its shops with more traditional and original establishments. Centennial shops, local shops, high-quality shops and establishments with prestigious brands stand out, all of which generate a very important economic dynamism for the municipality. 

Calella also has the municipal market, open from Tuesday to Saturday, and a weekly market that is held on Saturdays, right in front of the municipal market. 

There remains an agricultural sector dedicated to strawberries. Worth mentioning is the Strawberry Harvesters Association (UMAC).

Sport 

Calella was awarded the title of “Catalan Capital of Sport” by La Fundació Catalana per a l ’Esport (The Catalan Foundation for Sports) in 2019. Calella has become the first town to obtain this title which is awarded to a Catalan municipality with the aim of making it a sports reference town throughout the year and promoting the values of sport.

For more than 60 years, Calella has been recognized as one of the leading tourist destinations at a national and European level, and since the beginning of the tourist activity, a number of businessmen and sports organizations in the city have seen sport as an important economic asset. The organization of international handball and soccer tournaments and sports stays, were the embryo of the current distinction of sports tourist destination. But also domestic tourism, especially from Barcelona, contributed to the development of important clubs and facilities such as sailing, swimming, tennis, among other sports.

This has led to a notable increase in the potential of the city in the field of sports. Calella has a number of sports associations,  49 sports disciplines are practiced, 43 of which, recognized by federations; 32 sports entities, 15 club sports schools, 9 public sports facilities, 11 private facilities and 16 free-use places for sports.

Calella is one of the cities in Catalonia where the ratio of people linked to sport in relation to the total population is one of the highest in the country. The climatic and geographical conditions have favored a great diversity of sports practices, with track and field sports, outdoor sports and sea and mountain sports activities. Undoubtedly, this social substrate, so active and dynamic in promoting and practicing sports, generates very strong dynamics and synergies in the day-to-day life of the city and allows many sports competitions and activities to be proposed, scheduled and organized.

The city of Calella hosts more than a hundred sporting events in many different sports disciplines and in a great diversity of spaces in the municipality, as well as a high number of sports concentrations and other activities related to sports practice, with the participation of people of all ages and from many countries of the world.

The population of Calella, distinguished with the ‘Sports Tourism Destination’ certificate (2009), has a close relationship with the world of sports. In addition, thanks to major sporting events such as the 1st stage of the Tour of Catalonia or the renowned triathlon, “Calella Barcelona Ironman”, this town has become a top destination amongst cycling fans.

In Calella there are different facilities for sports: athletics tracks, an Olympic swimming pool and municipal swimming pool, the seafront and roads near the town. Sports lovers on holiday in Calella can enjoy road cycling, football, basketball, volleyball and handball.

·        Water sports such as parasailing, windsurfing, sailing or kayaking. Calella's “Water Sports Center” has been offering a wide range of nautical activities for more than 30 years. 

·        Annual handball and beach tennis championships. 

·        Triathlon - For more than 10 years, Calella has kept a very strong relationship with the world of Triathlon. The prestigious brand "IronMan'' develops two annual competitions in the city and several teams choose Calella as their training center every year. Calella hosts Ironman 70.3 with  distances: 1.9 km swimming, 90 km cycling and 21.20 km running (a half marathon), and Barcelona-Calella IRONMAN- distances: 3.8 km swimming, 180 km cycling and 42.2 km running (a marathon). 

·        Road cycling and Mountain biking.- Calella is ideal for road cycling because it has a wide variety of routes and there are several shops in the town for cyclists. The Montnegre i el Corredor Natural Park, a few kilometers from Calella, is an excellent natural area full of paths for mountain biking through a bucolic landscape. The park offers more than 90km of BTT routes for all levels.

·        Nordic Walking in Calella (link Nordic walking certified routes network)

·        Vies Braves, sea swimming lanes in Calella - The Vies Braves are a marine and open water public network for sports, leisure and educational activities. Calella Via Brava on the Barcelona coast is 1 km long, of medium difficulty and is usually open from May to October. It is ideal for swimming in open water and snorkeling.

·        Basketball -Calella was the Catalan city of basketball in 2018. Furthermore, its local club “Club Bàsquet Calella” is one of the most active institutions in the city. The municipal pavilion "Parc Dalmau" hosts their matches, offering an optimal space for the practice of this sport.

·        Swimming -The city inaugurated it Olympic Pool in 2004. “Crol Centre” has hosted major events such as the Spanish Swimming Championship and the World Swimming World Cup trainings. Its facilities receive constant improvements.

·        Football - “La Muntanyeta” facilities offer a completely new hybrid soccer field combined with new changing rooms. The other football field of the city is the emblematic "Camp de Mar". Located a few meters away from the Mediterranean Sea, this field hosts the centennial club "Club de Futbol Calella", created in 1917.

·        Athletics - “La Muntanyeta” sports facilities include a completely new athletics track. In addition, the city holds a great relationship with this sport thanks to its local athletics club and the footprint left by the 1992 Barcelona Olympic Games.

·        Racket sports - Tennis, table tennis and paddle tennis are also very popular in Calella. All of them are widely practiced in the city, at any time of the year. These sports have a great presence thanks to their respective clubs “Club Tennis Calella”, “Club Tennis Taula Calella” and “Pàdel Calella”.

·        Handball -Calella's beach has hosted great beach handball tournaments, such as “Trofeu Ciutat de Calella” International Tournament. This event has received hundreds of teams during its 37 editions. Calella offers an unbeatable environment for the practice of this sport. The city hosts “UEH Calella”, a handball club born in 1982.

·        Volleyball -The city has more than 10 beach volleyball sand courts. The local entity "AVPC" promotes the practice of beach volleyball by improving the local players' level. In addition, Calella hosts different beach volleyball tournaments throughout the year.

Sanitary Equipment 

 Hospital “Sant Jaume”. with 147 hospital beds, 4 surgery places, 5 operating rooms, 3 delivery rooms, 38 external consultations, 20 day hospital places, 34 emergency boxes
 The Basic Health Area of Calella (ABS) is made up of a single Primary Care Centre, the CAP Calella. This device covers more than 18,700 people.
 Creu Groga: Private Medical Centre with 35 medical specialities, 123  doctors and more 27 technicians and professionals 
 Three Elderly Day- Centres (capacity 80 people)
 Five Old Age Homes (capacity 496 residents)

External links

Official website of the town 
Historic and artistic heritage 
 Government data pages

Calella Photo Gallery

References

Municipalities in Maresme
Beaches of Catalonia
Populated places in Maresme
Seaside resorts in Spain